Saint Gerald  may refer to:

Gerald of Aurillac celebrated on October 13
Gerald of Braga celebrated on December 5

Gerald of Mayo celebrated on March 13

Gerald of Sauve-Majeure celebrated on April 5
Gerald of Toul celebrated on April 23